Domenicus Verwilt (sometimes ver Wilt) was a Flemish painter active in Sweden.

Biography
According to the RKD he is known for portraits and historical allegories. Though his birth and death dates are uncertain, he is registered working in Antwerp from 1544 to 1555 and in Sweden between 1556 and 1566, where he became court painter to Eric XIV of Sweden. He probably knew the portrait painter Steven van der Meulen from his period in Antwerp, who also visited the court of Eric XIV and made a painting of him in 1561.

See also
Flemish painting

Notes

References
Domenicus Verwilt on Artnet

1520s births
1560s deaths
Artists from Antwerp
Court painters
Flemish Renaissance painters
Belgian expatriates in Sweden